IV liga Warmia-Masuria group (grupa warmińsko-mazurska) is one of the groups of IV liga, the 5th level of Polish football league system. 
The league was created in season 2000–2001 after introducing new administrative division of Poland. Until the end of the 2007/08 season IV liga was placed at 4th tier of league system but this was changed with the formation of the Ekstraklasa as the top-level league in Poland.
The clubs from Warmian-Masurian Voivodeship compete in this group. The winner of the league is promoted to III liga group I. The bottom teams are relegated to the groups of Liga okręgowa from Warmian-Masurian Voivodeship. These groups are Warmia-Masuria I and Warmia-Masuria II.

Season 2000–01 

Final table:

Season 2001–02 

Final table:

Season 2002–03 

Final table:

Season 2003–04 

Final table:

Season 2004–05 

Final table:

Season 2005–06 

Final table:

Season 2006–07 

Final table:

Season 2007–08 

Final table:

Season 2008–09 

Final table:

Season 2009–10 

Final table:

Season 2010–11 

Final table:

Season 2011–12 

Final table:

Season 2012–13 

Final table:

Season 2013–14 

Final table:

Season 2014–15 

Final table:

Season 2015–16 

Final table:

Season 2016–17 

Final table:

Season 2017–18 

Final table:

Season 2018–19 

Final table:

Season 2019–20 

Final table  (due to COVID-19 pandemic league was ended after 17th round):

Season 2020-21 

Final table:
TBA

All-time table

Locations of the clubs 
Locations of all clubs playing in IV liga Warmia-Masuria group:

References

Football leagues in Poland
Warmian-Masurian Voivodeship